Smidary is a municipality and village in Hradec Králové District in the Hradec Králové Region of the Czech Republic. It has about 1,500 inhabitants.

Administrative parts
Villages of Červeněves, Chotělice, Křičov and Loučná Hora are administrative parts of Smidary.

References

External links

Villages in Hradec Králové District